The Weatherly 620 is a 1970s American agricultural monoplane designed and built as an improved variant of the Weatherly 201 by the Weatherly Aircraft Company of McClellan, California.

Design
The Weatherley 620 is an all-metal single-seat low-wing cantilever monoplane with a conventional landing gear with a tailwheel. Examples have been fitted with a Pratt & Whitney R-985 radial engine, and PT6A or TPE331 turboprop engine, driving a three-bladed tractor propeller. In the forward fuselage, the aircraft has a either a 355 US gallon hopper or a 320 US gallon hopper that feeds an agricultural dispersal system. Most pilots that fly the weatherly aircraft, prefer the 320 gallon hopper aircraft.

Variants
Model 620
1979 initial production variant.
Model 620A
1987 production variant with a Pratt & Whitney R-985 radial engine.
Model 620B
1992 production variant with a Pratt & Whitney R-985 radial engine.
Model 620TP
1980 turboprop variant with a Pratt & Whitney PT6A-11AG.
Model 620B-TG
1997 improved turboprop variant to replace the 620TP with a Honeywell TPE331 turboprop.

Specifications (620BTG)

References
Notes

Bibliography

External links

  TYPE CERTIFICATE DATA SHEET NO. A26WE

1970s United States agricultural aircraft
Single-engined tractor aircraft
Low-wing aircraft
620
Single-engined turboprop aircraft
Aircraft first flown in 1979
Conventional landing gear